Mahinda Vilathgamuwa is Professor of Power Engineering in the School of Electrical Engineering and Robotics at Queensland University of Technology (QUT) in Brisbane, Australia.

After completing his high school education at Nalanda College, Colombo, Vilathgamuwa entered the University of Moratuwa; graduating with a Bachelor of Science (BSc) in Electrical Engineering (Honours) in 1984.

In 1985 Vilathgamuwa started his academic career as assistant lecturer at University of Moratuwa. Later after obtaining a Doctor of Philosophy (PhD) in Electrical Engineering from University of Cambridge, England he became a senior lecturer at Moratuwa. His doctoral thesis was entitled Control of voltage-sourced reversible rectifiers 

From 1993 - 2013 Vilathgamuwa served as an academic in the capacities of lecturer, assistant professor and associate professor at Nanyang Technological University (NTU) in Singapore.

Professor Vilathgamuwa is a fellow of the Institute of Electrical and Electronics Engineers (IEEE).

General references 

 
ORCiD ID 0000-0003-0895-8443

References 

Sri Lankan Buddhists
Sinhalese academics
Alumni of Nalanda College, Colombo
Alumni of the University of Moratuwa
Alumni of the University of Cambridge
Sinhalese engineers
Sri Lankan expatriate academics
Academic staff of Nanyang Technological University
Academic staff of Queensland University of Technology
Fellow Members of the IEEE